The Men's bantamweight competition at the 2009 World Taekwondo Championships was held at the Ballerup Super Arena in Copenhagen, Denmark on October 16. Bantamweights were limited to a maximum of 63 kilograms in body mass.

Medalists

Results
Legend
DQ — Won by disqualification
RSC — Won by referee stop contest

Finals

Top half

Section 1

Section 2

Section 3

Section 4

Bottom half

Section 5

Section 6

Section 7

Section 8

References
Draw
 Official Report

Men's 63